Vincenzo Spisanelli (1595–1662) was an Italian painter of the Baroque period, active mainly in Bologna.

Spisanelli was born at Orta San Giulio, Piedmont. He was a pupil of Denis Calvaert in Bologna, but was also active in Ferrara, Imola, Modena, and in Lombardy.

He survived the plague of 1630, but not his wife, and he was afflicted with melancholy for the remainder of his life. He was prolific in the painting of altarpieces.  He is also called Lo Spisanelli or Pisanelli, Spisano, or Spisani. His only son, the painter Giulio Pisanelli, died a few years before his father. He died at Bologna in 1662.

References

1595 births
1662 deaths
People from Orta San Giulio
16th-century Italian painters
Italian male painters
17th-century Italian painters
Painters from Bologna
Italian Baroque painters